16 Cook Street, Liverpool is the world's second glass curtain walled building. Designed by Peter Ellis in 1866, it is a Grade II* Listed Building.

Built two years after Oriel Chambers on Water Street, the architect's best-known work, it shows the development of Ellis' style. Its floor to ceiling glass allows light to penetrate deep into the building, contrasting strongly with the adjacent structures. It has been suggested that American architect John Root was influenced by the construction of both buildings, having studied in Liverpool at the time of their construction.

Both 16 Cook Street and Oriel Chambers were featured in the ITV (Granada / Tyne Tees) television programme Grundy's Northern Pride, looking at John Grundy's favourite buildings in the north of England, aired on 9 January 2007.

See also
Architecture of Liverpool

References

External links
 Page on the Liverpool Architectural Society website
 

Grade II* listed buildings in Liverpool